Exposed is a 2013 American documentary film directed by Beth B.

The film premiered in the Panorama portion of the 2013 Berlin International Film Festival.

Synopsis
American documentary about eight women and men using their naked bodies, be they statuesque, disabled, transgender, for the cutting edge of burlesque.

References

External links

2013 LGBT-related films
American LGBT-related films
Transgender-related documentary films
2013 documentary films
2013 films
Documentary films about sexuality
Burlesque
American independent films
American documentary films
Documentary films about people with disability
2010s English-language films
2010s American films